Li Yajun (born 27 April 1993) is a Chinese weightlifter, Olympian, and World Champion competing in the 53 kg category until 2018 and 55 kg starting in 2018 after the International Weightlifting Federation reorganized the categories.

Career
She competed at the 2013 World Championships in the Women's 53 kg, winning the gold medal.

Major results

References

External links
 
 
 
 

1993 births
Living people
Chinese female weightlifters
World Weightlifting Championships medalists
Olympic weightlifters of China
Weightlifters at the 2016 Summer Olympics
20th-century Chinese women
21st-century Chinese women